= Pedro Alcántara Quijano Montero =

Colombian artist and author (1878–1953)

- Born: 1878; Bogotá, Colombia
- Died: 1953 (aged 74–75); Bogotá, Colombia
- Education: Escuela de Bellas Artes

Pedro Alcántara Quijano Montero (1878–1953) was a Colombian artist, engraver, author and set designer.

== Life ==
Born in Bogotá, Quijano Montero studied at Escuela de Bellas Artes under Recio, among others. Later, he taught at his alma mater for more than 30 years. He was also a set designer for the Teatro Colón de Bogotá, and taught several generations of Colombian artists.

He wrote various works including: Ricaurte en San Mateo, Niño con Casco, La misa de los conquistadores, La Pola conducida al cadalso, and Reyerta del 20 de julio. Quijano Montero died in Bogotá in 1953.
